The 1984 International Rules Series, known for sponsorship reasons as the GAA Bank of Ireland International Series, was the first official series between Gaelic footballers from Ireland and Australian rules footballers from Australia. The series took place in Ireland and consisted of three test matches between the Australian and Irish international rules football teams.

While this was the first time these two countries had played a test series against each other, Australian representative teams had toured Ireland before 1967 and 1968 Australian Football World Tours. The series coincided with the centenary year of the Gaelic Athletic Association.

Australia, who were coached by John Todd and captained by another Western Australian Steve Malaxos, started the tour with a warm up match against a Connacht GAA team at Pearse Stadium. Australia lost the encounter by 14 points. In between the first and second tests, Australia were beaten by Ulster, 78 points to 28, at Armagh.

The Australian team won the test series 2–1 and finished with a superior aggregate of 222 points to Ireland's 208.

Summary

First test
21 October 1984
Venue: Páirc Uí Chaoimh, Cork 
Crowd: 8,000

Second test
28 October 1984
Venue: Croke Park, Dublin 
Crowd: 12,500

Third test
4 November 1984
Venue: Croke Park, Dublin 
Crowd: 32,318

Beitzel Medal (Best player for the series) — J.Kerrigan (Ireland)

References

External links
 Australia v. Ireland since 1967
 Aussie Rules International: The Inaugural Series – 1984
 GAA: International Rules – Series 1 – 1984 – Ireland

International Rules Series
International Rules Series
International Rules series
International sports competitions hosted by Ireland